Field stain is a histological method for staining of blood smears. It is used for staining thick blood films in order to discover malarial parasites. Field's stain is a version of a Romanowsky stain, used for rapid processing of the specimens. 

Field's stain consists of two parts - Field's stain A is methylene blue and Azure 1 dissolved in phosphate buffer solution; Field's stain B is Eosin Y in buffer solution. Field stain is named after physician John William Field, who developed it in 1941.

Additional images

References

External links
Field stain recipe (thelabrat.com)

Histopathology
Staining
Romanowsky stains